Anti-Sunnism is hatred of, prejudice against, discrimination against, persecution of, and violence against Sunni Muslims.

Alternatively it has also been described as "Sunniphobia", which is the "Fear or hatred of Sunnism and Sunnites".

The term "Wahhabi" has frequently been used to demonize lay Salafi Muslims.

War on Terror Rhetoric
Muhammad ibn Abdul Wahhab was a Sunni Muslim reformer of 18th century Arabia. The religious clergy of the Ottoman Empire considered him and his supporters to be heretics and apostates. They were labelled by the term "Wahhabi". During the 19th century, the British colonial government in India placed anti-colonial Sunni scholars on trial in what became known as the "Great Wahhabi Trials" to suppress an imagined "Wahhabi conspiracy".

To be a Wahhabi is officially a crime in Russia. In Russian aligned Central Asian dictatorships, the term "Wahhabi" is used to refer to any unsanctioned religious activity. As a result, any Sunni Muslim, whether modernist, Conservative, political or apolitical is a potential target.

In response to 9/11 World Trade Centre Bombings, the United States and its allies launched a controversial policy of an unprecedented counter-terrorism effort on an international scale dubbed as the War on Terror. It was characterised by the infamous words "You are either with us or against us".

Both this approach, as well as the purpose of a War on Terror has been questioned. It has also been accused of inciting various forms of Islamophobia on a global scale.

The "War on Terror" rhetoric has been adopted by other authoritarian regimes. Israel, Russia, China, etc. has frequently invoked the "Wahhabi" label to target Sunni Muslims. Russia has employed its own "War on Terror" in the Second Chechen War, insurgency in North Caucasus and currently in the Russian war in Syria.

In a sectarian twist, War on Terror rhetoric has also been weaponised by Islamic Republic of Iran which follows the Khomeinist interpretation of Islam, even closely cooperating with US frequently. Iranian officials commonly invoke the "Wahhabi" label to further its sectarian identity politics in the region. Even prior to the War on Terror, Iranian leaders like Ayatollah Khomeini and Rafsanjani had invoked the Wahhabi label describing Sunnis as "heretics" to stir up Sunniphobia and Iran's policy of exporting its Islamic Revolution. After the War on Terror, its perceived that an imagined Wahhabi conspiracy replaced America as Iran's Great Satan. This was further revealed by the statements of Qassem Soleimani, the former chief of IRGC who labelled "Wahhabism" with Jewish roots. Hassan Nasrallah, the Secretary General of Hezbollah labelled "Wahhabism" as "more evil than Israel". In even more provocative tone, Iranian Foreign Minister Javad Zarif penned a controversial article in The New York Times titled  "Let Us Rid the World of Wahhabism" wherein he described Wahhabism as a "theological perversion", "a death cult" that has "wrought havoc" and labelled virtually every terrorist group as "Wahhabi".

Historic persecution

Safavid period

In response to the growth of the Sunni Islam, the Safavid dynasty killed many Sunnis, attempted to convert them  to Shi'ism, many of the burials of the Sunni saints were burned by the orders of Safavid Shahs, the Sunni states were also occupied. They also cursed the first three caliphs of Sunni Muslims, and also Aisha and Hafsa, the daughters of first two caliphs and the wives of the Islamic prophet.

Ismail I made new laws for Iran and the lands he controlled:

Imposing Shiism as the state and mandatory religion for the whole nation and much forcible conversion of Iranian Sufi Sunnis to Shiism.
He reintroduced the Sadr (Arabic, leader) – an office that was responsible for supervising religious institutions and endowments. With a view to transforming Iran into a Shiite state, the Sadr was also assigned the task of disseminating Twelver doctrine.
He destroyed Sunni mosques. This was even noted by Tomé Pires, the Portuguese ambassador to China who visited Iran in 1511–12, who when referring to Ismail noted: "He (i.e. Ismail) reforms our churches, destroys the houses of all Moors who follow (the Sunnah of) Muhammad..."
He enforced the ritual and compulsory cursing of the first three Sunni Caliphs (Abu Bakr, Umar, and Uthman) as usurpers, from all mosques, disbanded Sunni Tariqahs and seized their assets, used state patronage to develop Shia shrines, institutions and religious art and imported Shia scholars to replace Sunni scholars.
He killed Sunnis and destroyed and desecrated their graves and mosques. This caused the Ottoman Sultan Bayezid II (who initially congratulated Ismail on his victories) to advise and ask the young monarch (in a "fatherly" manner) to stop the anti-Sunni actions. However, Ismail was strongly anti-Sunni, ignored the Sultan's warning, and continued to spread the Shia faith by the sword.
He persecuted, imprisoned, exiled, and executed stubbornly resistant Sunnis.
With the establishment of Safavid rule, there was a very raucous and colourful, almost carnival-like holiday on 26 Dhu al-Hijjah (or alternatively, 9 Rabi' al-awwal) celebrating the assassination of Caliph Omer. The highlight of the day was making an effigy of Umar to be cursed, insulted, and finally burned. However, as relations between Iran and Sunni countries improved, the holiday was no longer observed (at least officially).
In 1501, Ismail invited all the Shia living outside Iran to come to Iran and be assured of protection from the Sunni majority.

Modern Times

Iraq

The Iraqi government installed after the 2003 invasion of Iraq has been responsible for systematic discrimination of Sunni Muslims in bureaucracy, politics, military, police, as well as allegedly massacring Sunni Muslim prisoners in a sectarian manner. The De-Ba'athification policy implemented after the toppling of the Baathist regime has mostly been targeting Sunni civil servants, politicians and military officials; leading to anti-Sunni discrimination in the bureaucracy and worsening of the sectarian situation in Iraq. Many Sunnis were killed following the 2006 al-Askari mosque bombing during the Iraqi Civil War.

Barwana massacre

The massacre was allegedly committed by Shia militants, as a revenge for ISIS atrocities, in the Sunni village of Barwana, allegedly killing 70 boys and men.

Hay al Jihad massacre 

On 9 July 2006, in the Hay al-Jihad area of Baghdad, the capital of Iraq, an estimated 40 Sunni civilians were killed in revenge attacks carried out by Shia militias from the Mahdi Army.

Musab bin Umair mosque massacre

On 22 August 2014, Shia militants killed at least 73 people in an attack on the Sunni Mus`ab ibn `Umair mosque in the Imam Wais village of Iraq, the attack occurred during the Friday prayers, where many of the Sunnis were attending their prayers. and at the time of the attack, there were about 150 worshippers at the mosque. The militants were later found to be not guilty. The militants allegedly belonged to the Iranian-backed Mahdi Army.

Iran 

Iran's first Supreme Leader Khomeini had held deeply anti-Sunni religious views, which was also reflected in the geo-political strategy he outlined in his "Last Will and Testament". After Khomeini’s death in 1989, Iranian regime began publicly exporting Anti-Sunni rhetoric through propaganda and Khomeinist media outlets across the Islamic World, in increasing proportions particularly since the 2000s. In addition to persecuting Sunnis abroad, Sunnis in Iran are also subject to systematic discrimination by the government. Ethnic minorities that are predominantly Sunni; such as the Kurds, the Balochs, the Turkmens and the Arabs suffer the brunt of the religious persecution; and numerous Masajid (mosques) of these communities are routinely destroyed by the security forces. Inspite of the presence of 10 million Sunni inhabitants in Tehran, the regime has also banned the presence of Sunni mosques in the city, leading to widespread discontent. Many Sunni Imams independent of the regime, have been assassinated by Khomeinist deathsquads.

In a brutal massacre known as "Bloody Friday" conducted in September 2022, IRGC and Basij forces opened fired and killed over 90 Sunni worshippers during Jumu'ah prayers at Jameh Mosque of Makki in Sistan-Balochistan, the largest Sunni mosque in Iran. As of October 2022, the massacre is the deadliest incident that occurred as part of the military crackdown on 2022 Iranian protests. Molwi Abdolhamid Ismaeelzahi, popular Baloch Islamic scholar and spiritual leader of Iran's Sunni Muslim minority, who led the prayers denounced the regime for the massacre and its "absolute lies" stereotyping the regular Sunni worshippers as Baloch separatists. In an unusual speech condemning Ali Khamenei and Iranian army for the violence and bloodshed, Abdul Hamid declared: "The supreme leader of the Islamic Republic, as the commander-in-chief of the armed forces, as well as other officials are all responsible, and no one can evade this responsibility.."

United States

1973 Hanafi Muslim massacre

The Hanafi Muslim massacre of 1973 took place on the afternoon of 18 January 1973, when two adults and a child were shot dead. Four other children between the ages of nine and ten drowned. Two others were seriously injured. The murders took place at a home whose street address was 7700 16th Street NW, Washington, D.C., which a group of Hanafi Muslims bought and named the "Hanafi American Muslim Rifle and Pistol Club".

See also
 Anti-Islamism
 Anti-Shi'ism
 Persecution of Hazara people
 Persecution of minority Muslim groups
 Persecution of Muslims
 Persecution of Sufis

References

 
Sectarian violence
Shia–Sunni sectarian violence
Sunni Muslims
Sunnis
Persecution of Muslims
Islam-related controversies